|}

The Golden Rose Stakes is a Listed flat horse race in Great Britain open to horses aged three years or older. It is run at Lingfield Park over a distance of 6 furlongs and 1 yard (1,028 metres), and it is scheduled to take place each year in November.

Winners since 2007

See also 
 Horse racing in Great Britain
 List of British flat horse races

References 

Racing Post:

Flat races in Great Britain
Lingfield Park Racecourse
Open sprint category horse races